Rukia  is a small genus  of birds in the white-eye family. Its two members are found in the Federated States of Micronesia on the  island of Pohnpei and the Faichuk group of the Chuuk islands. They are:
 Long-billed white-eye, Rukia longirostra
 Teardrop white-eye or Faichuk white-eye, Rukia ruki

The olive white-eye (Zosterops oleagineus) of Yap is traditionally included in this genus as Rukia oleaginea.

References
Rukia longirostra, IUCN Red List of Threatened Species, Retrieved 27 August 2014

 
Bird genera
Zosteropidae